GMN  may refer to:

Transport 
 Goregaon railway station, in Mumbai, India
 Great Missenden railway station, in England
 Greymouth Airport, in New Zealand
 Gulf, Mobile and Northern Railroad, an American railway

Other uses 
 Gimnime language
 Gospel Music Network